The 1926 CCNY Lavender football team was an American football team that represented the City College of New York (CCNY) as an independent during the 1926 college football season. In their third season under Harold J. Parker, the Lavender team compiled a 5–3 record.

Schedule

References

CCNY
CCNY Beavers football seasons
CCNY Lavender football